Chez Tortoni is a painting by the French artist Édouard Manet, painted ca. 1875. The oil-on-canvas painting measures . The painting hung in the Isabella Stewart Gardner Museum of Boston, Massachusetts, United States, prior to being stolen in 1990.

Description
The painting depicts an unidentified gentleman sitting at a table in the  while drawing on a sketchpad. A half-empty glass of beer stands on the table.

Provenance
The painting hung in the Isabella Stewart Gardner Museum of Boston, Massachusetts, United States, prior to being stolen on March 18, 1990. The painting has not yet resurfaced.

A $10 million reward is offered for the return of the stolen items.

In popular culture
The painting was featured in a background scene in Season 3, Episode 1 ("The Birthday") of The Vampire Diaries.

See also

List of paintings by Édouard Manet
List of stolen paintings

References

Paintings by Édouard Manet
Stolen works of art
Food and drink paintings
Lost paintings